Alopeconnesus or Alopekonnesos ("fox island") was an ancient Greek city located on the western coast of ancient Thrace, located in the region of the Thracian Chersonesus. It was an Aeolian colony, and was believed to have derived its name from the fact that the settlers were directed by an oracle to establish the colony, where they should first meet a fox with its cub. In the time of the Macedonian ascendancy, it was allied with, and under the protection of Athens. Coinage of Alopeconnesus have survived.

The Platonic philosopher, Menaechmus was from Alopeconnesus or Prokonnesos.

Its site has been located on Anafarta Liman.

See also
Greek colonies in Thrace

References

Populated places in ancient Thrace
Former populated places in Turkey
Aeolian colonies
Greek colonies in the Thracian Chersonese
History of Çanakkale Province